Delivering the Goods may refer to:

A song on the album Killing Machine by the heavy metal band Judas Priest.
A 2012 movie starring Thomas Ian Nicholas.

Songs written by Glenn Tipton
Songs written by Rob Halford
Songs written by K. K. Downing
1978 songs
Judas Priest songs